A list of films produced in South Korea in 1976:

References

External links
1976 in South Korea

 1970-1979 at www.koreanfilm.org

1976
South Korean
1976 in South Korea